Liptena batesana, the Bates' liptena, is a butterfly in the family Lycaenidae. It is found in Cameroon, the Republic of the Congo, and Uganda (Bwamba).

References

Butterflies described in 1926
Liptena